The Michigan Air Line Railroad was a railroad across southern Michigan, connecting the Canada Southern Railway to Chicago, Illinois. Only part of the line was built before the company that first built it folded, and it was split between the Michigan Central Railroad (part of the New York Central Railroad, which also acquired the Canada Southern Railway) and the Grand Trunk Railway, which completed the line.

History
The Grand Trunk Railway was chartered in Michigan and Indiana, and the two companies merged in July and August 1868, just after the Canada Southern Railway was chartered, to form the Michigan Air Line Railroad. The Michigan Air Line and Canada Southern planned to form a continuous line from Buffalo, New York west to Chicago, Illinois via a train ferry across the St. Clair River. In 1871 the line was planned as part of a longer Portland, Rutland, Oswego and Chicago Railroad, but that fell through.

On 11 October 1870 the St. Joseph Valley Railroad was merged into the company, providing a branch from Niles south to South Bend, Indiana. That line had opened in Spring 1870.

The main line was completed in February 1871, and ran from Niles east to Jackson and from Romeo east to Richmond, and was leased to the Michigan Central Railroad (as part of a shorter route between Detroit and Chicago). The Michigan Midland and Canada Railway was chartered in 1872 to continue east from Richmond to the St. Clair River, and opened in 1873 as part of the Canada Southern Railway. However, due to financial problems, the part between Jackson and Romeo was not built.

The east part, from Romeo to Richmond, was split off on 2 October 1872 as the St. Clair and Chicago Air Line Railroad, which leased the unbuilt St. Clair River, Pontiac and Jackson Railroad. The company went bankrupt in 1873, and on November 18, 1875 it was sold at foreclosure, with those lines east of Pontiac sold to the Michigan Air Line Railway. That company made arrangements for operation by the Grand Trunk Railway (which passed through Richmond). On 1 January 1881, the Grand Trunk leased the company, and the line was extended west to Jackson on 1 September 1884. The line from Pontiac to South Lyon was built on the planned right-of-way of the Toledo, Ann Arbor and North Eastern Railroad.

In 1916 the Michigan Air Line Railroad merged with the Michigan Central and ceased to exist as an independent company; the Michigan Air Line Railway merged with the Grand Trunk Western in 1928.

In 1984, Grand Trunk Western sold an 8-mile stretch of track between Wixom (CSX line) and West Bloomfield in Oakland County to Coe Rail, Inc.  It operated the Michigan Star Clipper Dinner Train and a small freight division.

In 2006, Railmark Holdings acquired Coe Rail and in 2007, it renamed the line to the Michigan Air-Line Railway, essentially back to its original name. 
The Michigan Star Clipper Dinner Train made its last excursion on 31 December 2008 and was retired from service completely in January 2009.

On 12 November 2009, Railmark sold the Michigan Air-Line Railway to the Nebraska-based Browner Turnout Company. In January 2011, Michigan Air-Line Railway applied to abandon its route, resulting in freight operations ending in December 2011. 

The railroad saw its last trains on 25 March 2012, consisting of moving equipment from Walled Lake to Wixom. It was removed between Wixom and West Bloomfield beginning in May of 2012. This left the last original main-line segment of the original Michigan Air Line Railroad abandoned.

In February 2015, the city of Walled Lake began drafting plans to convert the Wixom to West Bloomfield portion into a rail trail known as the Michigan Air Line Trail. The pedestrian bridge over M-5 was completed in 2018, with the remainder of the trail finished in 2020. This completes the continuous trail from Wixom to Pontiac.

As of May 2019, portions of the original railroad continue to serve many industries, but these lines are no longer mainline routes; they are only smaller spurs.

See also
Chicago and Canada Southern Railway, another partially built western extension of the Canada Southern Railway

References

External links
History of the Michigan Air-Line Railroad Company
History of the Michigan Central Railroad Company
South Lyon Depot (Witch's Hat)

Companies affiliated with the Michigan Central Railroad
Grand Trunk Railway subsidiaries
Defunct Michigan railroads
Defunct Indiana railroads
Defunct Illinois railroads
Predecessors of the New York Central Railroad
Predecessors of the Grand Trunk Railway
Railway companies established in 1868
Railway companies disestablished in 1916
1868 establishments in Michigan